María Estella del Valle (born 10 June 1994) is a Spanish footballer who plays as a defender for Granadilla.

Club career
Estella started her career at L'Estartit.

References

External links
Profile at La Liga

1994 births
Living people
Women's association football defenders
Spanish women's footballers
People from Baix Empordà
Sportspeople from the Province of Girona
Footballers from Catalonia
UE L'Estartit players
CE Sant Gabriel players
RCD Espanyol Femenino players
UD Granadilla Tenerife players
Primera División (women) players
Sportswomen from Catalonia